Duke of Atrisco is a hereditary title in the Peerage of Spain, accompanied by the dignity of Grandee and granted in 1708 by Philip V to José Sarmiento de Valladares, for his services as viceroy of New Spain.

The 1st Duke married the 3rd Countess of Moctezuma, granddaughter of Pedro Tesifón de Moctezuma, who in turn was a great-grandson of Moctezuma II, so, in this way, the Dukes of Atrisco were relatives of the Aztec emperor.

The name makes reference to the city of Atlixco, one of the three existing lordships in New Spain in 1708.

Dukes of Atrisco (1708)

José Sarmiento de Valladares y Arines, 1st Duke of Atrisco
Melchora Juana Sarmiento de Valladares y Moctezuma, 2nd Duchess of Atrisco
Bernarda Dominga Sarmiento de Valladares y Guzmán, 3rd Duchess of Atrisco
Ana Nicolasa de Guzmán y Córdoba, 4th Duchess of Atrisco
Ventura Osorio de Moscoso y Fernández de Córdoba, 5th Duke of Atrisco
Vicente Joaquín Osorio de Moscoso y Guzmán, 6th Duke of Atrisco
Vicente Isabel Osorio de Moscoso y Álvarez de Toledo, 7th Duke of Atrisco
Vicente Pío Osorio de Moscoso y Ponce de León, 8th Duke of Atrisco
María Cristina Osorio de Moscoso y Borbón, 9th Duchess of Atrisco
Pedro de Alcántara de Bauffremont y Osorio de Moscoso, 10th Duke of Atrisco
Leopoldo Barón y Osorio de Moscoso, 11th Duke of Atrisco
Gonzalo Barón y Gavito, 12th Duke of Atrisco
Adelaida Barón y Carral, 13th Duchess of Atrisco

See also
List of dukes in the peerage of Spain
List of current Grandees of Spain

References 

Dukedoms of Spain
Grandees of Spain
Lists of dukes
Lists of Spanish nobility